Parallel Minds is the second full-length album by the Norwegian power metal band, Conception, released on 10 November 1993.

Track listing

Notes
 The Japanese edition of the album features lyrics to the band's song "Black on Black" in the booklet, but does not feature the song on the Japanese releases.

Personnel
All information from the album booklet.
Band members
 Roy Khan – vocals
 Tore Østby – guitars
 Ingar Amlien – bass
 Arve Heimdal – drums

Additional personnel
 Hans Chr. Gjestvang – keyboards
 Michael Albers – cover art
 Tommy Newton – producer, engineering, mixing
 Ingo Chilmud – engineering
 Peter Vahlefeld – graphics

References

Conception (band) albums
1993 albums
Noise Records albums